The Consequences is a 2021 family drama film directed by Claudia Pinto Emperador. It stars Juana Acosta, Alfredo Castro, María Romanillos and Carme Elias.

Plot 
Following a travel to a small volcanic island, a woman starts suspecting something is wrong about her family.

Cast

Production 
The Consequences was directed by Claudia Pinto Emperador whereas the screenplay was co-written by Pinto alongside Eduardo Sánchez Rugeles.

Produced by Sin Rodeos Films and Las consecuencias AIE in co-production with N279 Entertainment, Potemkino and Érase una vez Films, the production was supported by RTVE, Eurimages, IVC (Institut Valencià de Cultura), the Netherland Film Fund, the Netherland Film Production Incentive, À Punt Mèdia, TV3 and it had the participation of CREA SRG. The film is an international Spanish–Belgian–Dutch co-production (70% – 15% – 15%). It was shot in 2019 in between the Valencia region and the Canary Islands, primarily displaying natural landscapes of the islands of La Palma and La Gomera.

Release 
The film was screened at the 24th Málaga Film Festival on 11 June 2021. It was theatrically released in Spain on 17 September 2021.

Awards 

|-
| align = "center" rowspan = "11" | 2021 || 24th Málaga Film Festival || Best Supporting Actress || María Romanillos ||  || 
|-
| 36th Guadalajara Film Festival || Best Actress in an Ibero-American Fiction Feature Film || María Romanillos ||  || 
|-
| rowspan = "9" | 4th Berlanga Awards || colspan = "2" | Best Feature Film ||  || rowspan = "9" | 
|-
| Best Director || Claudia Pinto Emperador || 
|-
| Best Screenplay || Claudia Pinto Emperador & Eduardo Sánchez Rugeles || 
|-
| Best Actress || Juana Acosta || 
|-
| Best Supporting Actress || María Romanillos || 
|-
| Best Editing and Post-Production || Elena Ruiz || 
|-
| Best Cinematography and Lighting || Gabo Guerra || 
|-
| Best Original Score || Vincent Barrière || 
|-
| Best Production Supervision || Jordi Llorca, Albert Espel, Yadira Ávalos,Carme Sánchez & Claudia Pinto ||  
|}

See also
 List of Spanish films of 2021

References

External links 
 The Consequences at the ICAA's Catálogo de Cinespañol

2021 films
Spanish drama films
2020s Spanish-language films
2021 drama films
Films shot in the Canary Islands
2021 thriller films
Films shot in the Valencian Community
2020s Spanish films